Shafter Airport , also known as Minter Field and formerly known as Air Corps Basic Flying School, is a public use airport located  east of the central business district of Shafter and 14 miles northwest of Bakersfield, a city in Kern County, California, United States. Originally a World War II primary training facility for pilots, it is currently a public airport owned by the Minter Field Airport District. This airport is included in the National Plan of Integrated Airport Systems for 2011–2015, which categorized it as a general aviation facility.

History 

Lerdo Field, as the airport was initially known during World War II, was first opened in June 1941 when the United States Army Air Corps (USAAC) dispatched a small garrison of airmen to open an airfield at Shafter.

The name was derived from close proximity to the highway of the same name.  The airfield commander utilized Bakersfield College as his headquarters, while airmen were quartered in temporary facilities from Bakersfield to Wasco while barracks and other structures were being built.  As construction proceeded through the rest of the year, the Minter Sub-Depot was established as a branch of the Sacramento Air Depot.

In August, the first operational training units (OTUs) began arriving at Lerdo Field, the airfields mission being advanced pilot training of USAAC bomber, attack, transport and pursuit pilots.  In April 1942, contracts for the construction of more than 65 on-base buildings were let, while the constantly increasing numbers of cadets were housed in a large tent city erected as temporary shelter.

With the relative completion of construction in July 1942, the airfield was renamed Minter Field Army Airfield after a member of the locally prominent Minter family, First Lieutenant Hugh C. Minter. Lieutenant Minter, a World War I veteran, was killed in a mid-air collision over March Field on July 8, 1932.  The airfield was placed under the overall command of the United States Army Air Forces West Coast Training Center. Known sub-bases and auxiliaries of Minter Field were:
 Wasco Auxiliary Airfield (No.1) –   now Wasco-Kern County Airport
 Pond Auxiliary Field (No. 2) –  – abandoned
 Famoso Auxiliary Airfield (No.3) –  – abandoned
 Dunlap Auxiliary Airfield (No.4) (AKA Jasmin Landing Field) –  – abandoned
 Semi-tropic Auxiliary Airfield (No.5) –  – abandoned
 Poso Auxiliary Airfield (No.6) –  now Poso Airport
 Lost Hills Auxiliary Airfield (No.7) –  now Lost Hills Airport
 Coalinga Municipal Airport (Old) (closed) – 

The primary aircraft flown at Minter Field was the Vultee BT-13 Valiant, which was used for f flight training.  Other training aircraft included the Cessna UC-78 Bobcat, AT-6 Texan advanced trainer, North American B-25 Mitchell twin-engine medium bomber, and Lockheed P-38 Lightning, as well as other widely used fighter, bomber and observation craft.

With the end of the war in 1945, the airfield was determined to be excess by the military and turned over to the local government for civil use in March 1948.

The Gossamer Condor piloted by Bryan Allen won the first Kremer prize on August 23, 1977, by completing a figure 8 course specified by the Royal Aeronautical Society at Minter Field.  California Historic Landmark #923 is located at the field to commemorate this event.

Facilities and aircraft 

For the 12-month period ending November 1, 2011, the airport had 45,000 general aviation aircraft operations, an average of 123 per day. At that time there were 114 aircraft based at this airport: 77% single-engine, 8% helicopter, 7% ultralight, 4% jet, and 4% multi-engine.

See also 

 California World War II Army Airfields
 35th Flying Training Wing (World War II)
 List of airports in Kern County, California

References

Other sources 
 
 Manning, Thomas A. (2005), History of Air Education and Training Command, 1942–2002.  Office of History and Research, Headquarters, AETC, Randolph AFB, Texas 
 Shaw, Frederick J. (2004), Locating Air Force Base Sites, History’s Legacy, Air Force History and Museums Program, United States Air Force, Washington DC.

External links

 Shafter Airport/Minter Field, official site
 Minter Field Air Museum
 Aerial image as of September 1994 from USGS The National Map
 

Airports in Kern County, California
San Joaquin Valley
Airfields of the United States Army Air Forces in California
Airports established in 1941
1941 establishments in California
USAAF Western Flying Training Command
American Theater of World War II